Hāfu is a Japanese language term used to refer to an individual born to one ethnic Japanese and one non-Japanese parent.

Hafu may also refer to:

 Hafu (film), a 2013 documentary about mixed-race, half Japanese people in Japan
 Hafu (video game player) (born 1991), American video game player
 Ha'afuasia, a village in Wallis
 Hafun, a town in Somalia